Haddock is a locality in Yellowhead County Alberta, Canada.

The first post office opened in 1915 and was named for Maude Haddock, the first postmistress.

References 

Localities in Yellowhead County